Scaphocephaly, or sagittal craniosynostosis, is a type of cephalic disorder which occurs when there is a premature fusion of the sagittal suture. Premature closure results in limited lateral expansion of the skull resulting in a characteristic long, narrow head. The skull base is typically spared.

Scaphocephaly is the most common of the craniosynostosis conditions and accounts for approximately 50% of all craniosynostosis. It is most commonly idiopathic (non-syndromic).

Etiology 
Non-syndromic

The underlying cause of the non-syndromic form is unknown. Over 100 mutations have been associated, including mutations in the FGFR genes. Several potential risk factors have been identified for craniosynostosis include:

 Advanced maternal age
 White maternal race
 Maternal smoking
 Male infant
 Certain paternal occupations (e.g. agriculture, forestry, repairmen) 

Syndromic

Sagittal craniosynostosis is seen in many conditions and syndromes:
 Acrocephalosyndactyly type I
 Baller-Gerold syndrome
 Cardiocranial syndrome, Pfeiffer type
 Coffin-Siris syndrome
 Cranioectodermal dysplasia
 Craniosynostosis and dental anomalies
 Craniosynostosis-anal anomalies-porokeratosis syndrome
 Craniosynostosis-Dandy-Walker malformation-hydrocephalus syndrome
 Crouzon syndrome
 Meier-Gorlin syndrome
 Neonatal diabetes mellitus with congenital hypothyroidism
 Noonan syndrome
 RAB23-related Carpenter syndrome
 Syndactyly type 1 (Chromosome 2q35 Duplication Syndrome)
 Tall stature-intellectual disability-facial dysmorphism syndrome
 TCF12-related craniosynostosis
 Teebi hypertelorism syndrome 
 Trigonocephaly-short stature-developmental delay syndrome
 TWIST1-related craniosynostosis

Diagnosis and evaluation 
Diagnosis of scaphocephaly is with physical exam, which may show characteristic features such as an elongated head in the anterior-posterior dimension, narrow head in the lateral dimension, and bony ridge at the vertex.

Further evaluation with imaging may also be performed. Ultrasound may be used to detect fusion of the suture. CT scans may also be used to help with surgical planning and to diagnose associated hydrocephalus, which has been found to be present in 44% of cases in one study. A measure of cephalic index may also be reduced, however the reliability of measurements may not be a reliable measure.

Atypical classification
Scaphocephaly is classified into 3 types, depending on morphology and position and suture closure:
 Sphenocephaly ("wedge-shaped", most common)
 Clinocephaly (camelback-shaped)
 Leptocephaly ("thin head", least common); this occurs when the metopic suture is also fused

Treatment
This condition can be corrected by surgery if the child is young enough, typically within the first 3–6 months. The goal of treatment is to correct intracranial pressure and repair bony deformities. The decision to treat is multifactorial and should be performed at a center with an experienced craniofacial team. In addition to the primary craniofacial surgeon, team members may include audiologists, dentists, otolaryngologists, neurosurgeons, plastic surgeons, and other supporting members.

Surgery is generally aimed at removal of the fused sagittal suture to allow for lateral expansion of the skull. Surgical options include:

 Endoscopic strip craniectomy: Minimally invasive removal of the fused suture. Following surgery, patients typically wear a helmet to help shape the head. Helmets are usually worn for 3–12 months.
 Open cranial vault remodeling: Open surgical removal of the fused sagittal suture and re-shaping of the skull, generally with resorbable plates.
 Spring cranioplasty: Combination of an endoscopic strip craniectomy with placement of springs which provide continuous force for re-shaping the skull.

Terminology
The term, from Greek skaphe meaning 'light boat or skiff' and kephale meaning 'head', describes a specific shape of a long narrow head that resembles a boat.

See also
 Dolichocephaly

References

External links 
 NINDS Overview

References 

Congenital disorders of musculoskeletal system